In algebra, Nagata's conjecture states that Nagata's automorphism of the polynomial ring k[x,y,z] is wild.

Nagata's automorphism is given by

where .

For the inverse, let 

References

Field (mathematics)
Theorems in algebra